Edgeley is a hamlet in the Canadian province of Saskatchewan and formerly (until the rationalisation of operations by the major Canadian grain-buying companies) the location of some half-dozen grain elevators.

At the outset of settlement of this part of the Canadian prairies, Edgeley was a centre of the Methodist Church of Canada's Qu'Appelle-Edgeley Circuit which later, in 1925, was absorbed into the United Church of Canada.

Once reached by road west of Highway 35 in the once densely populated Qu'Appelle-Fort Qu'Appelle hinterland as well as by rail, its significance has lapsed since the opening of Highway 10 from Balgonie to Fort Qu'Appelle and beyond to PTH 5 at the Manitoba border in the early 1960s, as it has been immediately adjacent to a major throughway.

Demographics 

References

Designated places in Saskatchewan
Organized hamlets in Saskatchewan
South Qu'Appelle No. 157, Saskatchewan
Division No. 6, Saskatchewan